Hillary Tuck is an American actress. She had roles in the NBC Saturday Morning sitcom Hang Time (1995–1996) and Disney's Honey, I Shrunk the Kids: The TV Show.

She has also guest starred in such television series as Roseanne, Boy Meets World, Judging Amy, House, The Closer, Bones, Ghost Whisperer, 90210 and others. 

Tuck has also appeared in the feature films Camp Nowhere (1994), The Great Mom Swap (1995), Life as a House (2001) and The Visitation (2006). She also played a new intern in the 2001 film How to Make a Monster. She also appeared in guest roles in The Mentalist (2012) and Grimm (2015).

Tuck married Bobby Croll in 2010; together, the couple have son Jasper (born 2014) and daughter Cleo (born October 2016).

Filmography

Film

Television

References

External links

20th-century American actresses
21st-century American actresses
Actresses from Texas
American child actresses
American film actresses
American television actresses
Living people
Year of birth missing (living people)